Steve Marino (born August 24, 1949) is a former American football coach. He served as the head football coach at Westfield State University in Westfield, Massachusetts from 1990 to 2013, compiling a record of 119–115–1.

Head coaching record

College

References

External links
 Westfield State profile

1949 births
Living people
Western New England Golden Bears football coaches
Westfield State Owls football coaches
High school football coaches in Massachusetts